Trichohestima is a genus of beetles in the family Cerambycidae, containing the following species:

 Trichohestima biroi (Breuning, 1953)
 Trichohestima setifera Breuning, 1943
 Trichohestima unicolor (Breuning, 1959)

References

Apomecynini